Panikos sta Scholeia ("Panic in the Schools") is a 1982 Greek film directed by Dimis Dadiras, written by Giorgos Mylonas and starring Giannis Voglis, Mary Chronopoulou and Apostolos Sougklakos.

Plot

Alexandros Makris (Giannis Tsilivakos), a student in an Athens school dies from a drug overdose. His father, Giannis Makris (Giannis Voglis), will try to uncover the drug dealers responsible for his only child's death and take revenge for it.

Cast

Giannis Voglis as Giannis Makris
Mairi Chronopoulou as Vicky
Nikos Apergis as Andreas Pavlou
Giannis Tsilivakos as Alexandros Makris
Nelli Gini as Miranda
Anestis Vlahos as Markos Avgeris
Lefteris Gyftopoulos as Fanis Politis

External links
Panikos sta scholeia at [http://www.cine.gr/ cine.gr 

1982 films
1980s Greek-language films
Greek thriller films
1982 thriller films